The 1934 Merthyr by-election was a parliamentary by-election held on 5 June 1934 for the British House of Commons constituency of Merthyr in Wales.

The seat had become vacant when the Labour Member of Parliament (MP) Richard Wallhead had died on 27 April 1934, aged 64.  He had won the seat at the 1922 general election as a Labour candidate.  At the 1931 general election, he had been returned as an Independent Labour Party (ILP) candidate, but had rejoined the Labour Party in 1933.

The Labour candidate, S. O. Davies, held the seat for his party.

Results

See also
 Merthyr constituency
 Merthyr Tydfil
 Lists of United Kingdom by-elections
 United Kingdom by-election records

References

Further reading
 
 

1930s in Glamorgan
1934 elections in the United Kingdom
1934 in Wales
1930s elections in Wales
June 1934 events
Politics of Merthyr Tydfil
By-elections to the Parliament of the United Kingdom in Welsh constituencies